Makaryino is a rural locality (a village) in Yurochenskoye Rural Settlement, Sheksninsky District, Vologda Oblast, Russia. The population was 8 as of 2002.

Geography 
Makaryino is located 22 km south of Sheksna (the district's administrative centre) by road. Sobolevo is the nearest rural locality.

References 

Rural localities in Sheksninsky District